Nenu may refer to:

 Nenu (film), a 2004 Indian Telugu-language film
 Nenu, Estonia
 Northeast Normal University, China